Hip hop music, or rap music, is a genre of popular music that originated in the Bronxborough area of New York City in the 1970s. 

Hip hop may also refer to:

Hip hop (culture), a culture and art movement created by African Americans, Latino Americans and Caribbean Americans in the Bronx, New York City
Hip hop dance, a range of street dance styles
Hip hop fashion, a distinctive style of dress
Hip-Hop Minister, Conrad Tillard

Songs
"Hip Hop" (Royce da 5'9" song), 2003
"Hip-Hop", a song by August Alsina from This Thing Called Life, 2015
"Hip Hop", a song by Bizarre featuring Eminem from Hannicap Circus, 2005
"Hip-Hop", a song by dead prez from Let's Get Free, 2000
"Hip Hop", a song by DJ Khaled featuring Nas and Scarface from Kiss the Ring, 2012
"Hip Hop", a song by Joell Ortiz from The Brick: Bodega Chronicles, 2007
"Hip Hop", a song by Large Professor from 1st Class, 2002
"Hip Hop", a song by LL Cool J from Mr. Smith, 1995
"Hip Hop", a song by Mos Def from Black on Both Sides, 1999

Other uses
HipHop for PHP, computer software
Hip Hop (mascot), former mascot of the Philadelphia 76ers
Hip Hop Since 1978, a music management/production company